XXV was the 25th season of the True Value International Race of Champions, which began on Friday, February 16, 2001 at Daytona International Speedway. The initial roster included 12 drivers from four separate Racing Leagues. After the first race, the series continued with only eleven drivers as a result of the death of Dale Earnhardt in the Daytona 500. Bobby Labonte won the championship.

The roster of drivers and final points standings were as follows:

* – Only raced in first race of season; this figure is unofficial.



Race One (Daytona International Speedway)
 Dale Jarrett
 Ricky Rudd
 Eddie Cheever
 Kenny Bräck
 Bobby Labonte
 Scott Goodyear
 Dale Earnhardt
 Mark Dismore
 Tony Stewart
 Jeff Burton
 Buddy Lazier
 Jeff Green

Race Two (Talladega Superspeedway)
 Bobby Labonte
 Kenny Bräck
 Buddy Lazier
 Ricky Rudd
 Eddie Cheever
 Jeff Burton
 Mark Dismore
 Jeff Green
 Scott Goodyear
 Tony Stewart
 Dale Jarrett

Race Three (Michigan International Speedway)
 Tony Stewart
 Al Unser Jr./Scott Goodyear
 Kenny Bräck
 Eddie Cheever
 Bobby Labonte
 Buddy Lazier
 Jeff Burton
 Dale Jarrett
 Jeff Green
 Ricky Rudd
 Mark Dismore

Race Four (Indianapolis Motor Speedway)
 Bobby Labonte
 Tony Stewart
 Kenny Bräck
 Dale Jarrett
 Al Unser Jr./Scott Goodyear
 Ricky Rudd
 Eddie Cheever
 Jeff Green
 Mark Dismore
 Jeff Burton
 Buddy Lazier

References

International Race of Champions
2001 in American motorsport